Eifion may refer to:

Places:
Eifion (UK Parliament constituency) in Caernarfonshire, Wales
Lôn Eifion, part of Lôn Las Cymru, the Welsh National Cycle Route

A Welsh given name:
Eifion Jones (1925–2004), Welsh marine botanist
Eifion Jones (cricketer) (born 1942), Welsh cricketer
Eifion Lewis-Roberts (born 1981), Welsh international rugby union player
Eifion Williams (born 1975), Welsh footballer
Eliseus Williams (Eifion Wyn) (1867–1926), Welsh language poet

Welsh masculine given names